Galiyon Kaa Badshah is a 1989 Indian Hindi-language action film directed by Sher Jung Singh. It stars Raaj Kumar, Hema Malini, Mithun Chakraborty, Poonam Dhillon, Smita Patil, Aruna Irani, Ranjeet, Danny Denzongpa, Iftekhar, Om Shivpuri. The film was shot and completed several years before its delayed release and marked the final film appearance of Smita Patil, who died in 1986.

Cast
Raaj Kumar as Raja / Ram
Hema Malini as Billo
Mithun Chakraborty as Sikandar 
Poonam Dhillon as Madhu
Smita Patil as Tulsi 
Aruna Irani as Rani Sahiba 
Shreeram Lagoo as Abdul
Parikshit Sahni as Rana 
Ranjeet as Tiger
Danny Denzongpa as Inspector Vijay 
Om Shivpuri as Seth Vinod Kumar
Iftekhar as Police Commissioner

Music

References

External links

Khatta Meetha Retrieved 17 October 2011

1989 films
1980s Hindi-language films
Indian action films
Films scored by Kalyanji Anandji
1989 action films
Hindi-language action films